Derrick D. T. Shepherd (born c. 1970) is an attorney and Democratic politician, formerly a member of the Louisiana Senate.

State Representative
Shepherd was first elected to the Louisiana House of Representatives in 2003 and took office in early 2004 as the Representative for the 87th House District.  He had received 60% of the vote.

State Senator

In May 2005, Shepherd won a special election and became the State Senator for the 3rd District.  He received 51% of the vote and succeeded Lambert Boissiere, Jr., who had won a seat on the Louisiana Public Service Commission.  Shepherd was re-elected in 2007 with 61% of the vote.

As a State Senator, proposed a bill to criminalize the wearing of "saggy" pants which displayed the wearer's underwear. This bill was not passed, although the measure provided excellent material for many comedians.

Federal politics
In November 2006, Shepherd ran against incumbent Bill Jefferson in Louisiana's 2nd congressional district.  Jefferson, who was dogged by allegations of corruption, was facing a tough re-election fight.  Shepherd finished third with 18% of the vote, behind Jefferson and Representative Karen Carter.

Conviction for corruption

On April 10, 2008, Shepherd was indicted by federal investigators on charges of corruption. Shepherd allegedly engaged in a money-laundering scheme, in which he is accused of laundering $141,000 for Gwen Moyo, a former insurance broker who was barred from that business due to a felony conviction. Moyo's business accounts were frozen, so Shepherd ran the funds through his business account, retaining $65,000 for his services. He has claimed that he performed 100 hours legitimate legal services for this money ($650 an hour). The Feds dispute Shepherd's account.

On October 10, 2008, Shepherd pleaded guilty to one count of conspiracy to commit money laundering.  He also resigned his state senate seat on the same day. In February 2010, Shepherd was sentenced to 37 months in prison.

Return to Politics
In 2019, Shepherd ran for Council District 3 of Jefferson Parish.

References

External links

Project Vote Smart – Senator Derrick T. Shepherd (LA) profile
Follow the Money – Derrick T Shepherd
2007 2005 State Senate campaign contributions
2003 State House campaign contributions

Democratic Party Louisiana state senators
Democratic Party members of the Louisiana House of Representatives
1970 births
Living people
African-American state legislators in Louisiana
Louisiana politicians convicted of crimes
People from Harvey, Louisiana
21st-century African-American people
20th-century African-American people